Fountain Bridge Halt was a small halt which served the community of Rudry in Caerphilly, South Wales. It opened in 1908 and closed in 1956.

The halt was situated on the PC&NR's Machen Loop Line, and as such, was served only by 'up' trains. Correspondingly, Waterloo Halt served the  same community, though catered only for 'down' services.

The halt had a ground-level platform, and was provided with only a lamp and a name board. Passengers were confined to a gated enclosure behind the platform, which was unlocked by the conductor on the train's arrival. The halt closed in 1956 when passenger services (already reduced to three a day) were withdrawn. The line is still present, but the site is now overgrown, with the trackbed having become waterlogged, and the bridge over the River Rhymney just beyond the halt has long been dismantled.

References

Disused railway stations in Caerphilly County Borough
Former Brecon and Merthyr Tydfil Junction Railway stations
Railway stations in Great Britain opened in 1908
Railway stations in Great Britain closed in 1956
1908 establishments in Wales
1956 disestablishments in Wales